Rajatarangini (Sanskrit: राजतरंगिणी, romanized: rājataraṃgiṇī, IPA: [ɾɑː.d͡ʑɐ.t̪ɐˈɾɐŋ.ɡi.ɳiː], "The River of Kings") is a metrical legendary and historical chronicle of the north-western part of India, particularly the kings of Kashmir. It was written in Sanskrit by Kashmiri historian Kalhana in the 12th century CE. The work consists of 7826 verses, which are divided between eight books called tarangas ("waves").

The Rajatarangini provides the earliest source on Kashmir that can be labeled as a "historical" text on this region. Although inaccurate in its chronology, the book still provides an invaluable source of information about early Kashmir and its neighbors in the north western parts of the Indian subcontinent, and has been widely referenced by later historians and ethnographers.

Context 

Little is known about the author Kalhana (c. 12th century CE), apart from what is written in the book. His father Champaka was the minister (Lord of the Gate) in the court of Harsha of Kashmir. In the first Taranga (book) of Rajatarangini, Kalhana expresses his dissatisfaction with the earlier historical books, and presents his own views on how history ought to be written:

 Verse 7. Fairness: That noble-minded author is alone worthy of praise whose word, like that of a judge, keeps free from love or hatred in relating the facts of the past.
 Verse 11. Cite earlier authors: The oldest extensive works containing the royal chronicles [of Kashmir] have become fragmentary in consequence of [the appearance of] Suvrata's composition, who condensed them in order that (their substance) might be easily remembered.
 Verse 12. Suvrata's poem, though it has obtained celebrity, does not show dexterity in the exposition of the subject-matter, as it is rendered troublesome [reading] by misplaced learning.
 Verse 13. Owing to a certain want of care, there is not a single part in Ksemendra's "List of Kings" (Nrpavali) free from mistakes, though it is the work of a poet.
 Verse 14. Eleven works of former scholars containing the chronicles of the kings, I have inspected, as well as the [Purana containing the] opinions of the sage Nila.
 Verse 15. By looking at the inscriptions recording the consecrations of temples and grants by former kings, at laudatory inscriptions and at written works, the trouble arising from many errors has been overcome.

Despite these stated principles, Kalhana's work is also full of legends and inconsistencies (see Historical reliability below).

List of kings 

The kings of Kashmir described in the Rajatarangini are given below. Notes in parentheses refer to a book ("Taranga") and verse.  Thus (IV.678) is Book IV verse 678. The summary is from J.C. Dutt's translation. Kalhana's work uses Kali and Laukika (or Saptarishi) calendar eras: the ascension year in CE, as given below, has been calculated by Dutt based on Kalhana's records.

Book 1 : Gonanda dynasty (I) 

Kalhana mentions that Gonanda I ascended the throne in 653 Kali calendar era. According to Jogesh Chander Dutt's calculation, this year corresponds to 2448 BCE. The total reign of the following kings is mentioned as 1266 years.

Gonanditya dynasty (I) 

The Gonanda dynasty ruled Kashmir for 1002 years.

Book 2 : Other rulers 

No kings mentioned in this book have been traced in any other historical source. These kings ruled Kashmir for 192 years.

Book 3: Restored Gonandiya dynasty

Book 4: Karkota dynasty

Book 5 : Utpala dynasty (Part-I)

Book 6 : Utpala dynasty (Part-II)

Book 7: First Lohara dynasty

Book 8: Second Lohara dynasty

Evaluation

Literary 

Kalhana was an educated and sophisticated Sanskrit scholar, well-connected in the highest political circles. His writing is full of literary devices and allusions, concealed by his unique and elegant style.

Historical reliability 

Despite the value that historians have placed on Kalhana's work, there is little evidence of authenticity in the earlier books of Rajatarangini. For example, Ranaditya is given a reign of 300 years. Toramana is clearly the Huna king of that name, but his father Mihirakula is given a date 700 years earlier. Even where the kings mentioned in the first three books are historically attested, Kalhana's account suffers from chronological errors.

Kalhana's account starts to align with other historical evidence only by Book 4, which gives an account of the Karkota dynasty. But even this account is not fully reliable from a historical point of view. For example, Kalhana has highly exaggerated the military conquests of Lalitaditya Muktapida.

Sequels 

 Rajatarangini by Jonaraja
 During the reign of Zain-ul-Abidin, Jonaraja authored a sequel by the same name. Also known as Dvitiya Rajatarangini ("second Rajatarangini"), it gives an account of Kashmir from c. 1150 CE to 1459 CE.

 Jaina-Rajatarangini by Shrivara
 After Jonaraja's death in 1459, his disciple Shrivara Pandita continued his work. He titled his work Jaina-Rajatarangini, and it is also known as Tritiya Rajatarangini ("third Rajatarangini"). It gives an account of Kashmir from 1459 CE to 1486 CE.

 Rajavalipataka by Prajyabhatta
 Prajyabhatta's Rajavalipataka gives an account of Kashmir from 1486 to 1512.

 Chaturtha Rajatarangini by Suka
 Suka extended Prajyabhatta's work, resulting in the Chaturtha Rajatarangini ("fourth Rajatarangini"). Suka's book ends with the arrival of Asaf Khan to Kashmir. A later interpolation also covers the arrival of the Mughal emperor Akbar and subsequent events.

Translations 

A Persian translation of Rajatarangini was commissioned by Zain-ul-Abidin, who ruled Kashmir in the 15th century CE.

Horace Hayman Wilson partially translated the work, and wrote an essay based on it, titled The Hindu History of Kashmir (published in Asiatic Researches Volume 15). Subsequent English translations of Kalhana's Rajatarangini include:

 Rajatarangini: The Saga of the Kings of Kashmir by Ranjit Sitaram Pandit (The Indian Press, Allahabad; 1935)
 Kings of Kashmira (1879) by Jogesh Chandra Dutt
 Kalhana's Rajatarangini: a chronicle of the kings of Kaśmir by Marc Aurel Stein

Translations in other languages include:

 Rajatarangini with Hindi commentary by Ramtej Shastri Pandey (Chaukhamba Sanskrit Pratishthan, 1985)
 Rajatarangini of Kalhana, edited by Vishwa Bandhu (1963–65); a later addition includes the texts of Jonaraja, Srivara and Suka (1966–67)
 Rajatarangini, Hindi translation by Pandit Gopi Krishna Shastri Dwivedi
  Histoire Des Rois Du Kachmir: Rajatarangini, French translation by M. Anthony Troyer
 Rajatarangini, Urdu translation by Pandit Thakar Acharchand Shahpuriah
 Rajatarangini, Telugu translation by Renduchintala Lakshmi Narasimha Sastry

Adaptations 

Several books containing legendary stories from Rajatarangini have been compiled by various authors. These include:

 S.L. Sadhu's Tales from the Rajatarangini (1967)
 Devika Rangachari's Stories from Rajatarangini: Tales of Kashmir (2001)
 Anant Pai's Amar Chitra Katha series:
 Chandrapeeda and other Tales of Kashmir (1984)
 The Legend of Lalitaditya: Retold from Kalhana's Rajatarangini (1999)

A television series based on Rajatarangini named Meeras began in 1986 in Doordarshan, Srinagar.

See also
Chach Nama, similar treatise about Sindh

Notes

References

Bibliography

External links 
 Rajatarangini of Kalhana - English translation by Jogesh Chunder Dutt
 Rajatarangini: The Saga of The Kings of Kasmir, English translation by Ranjit Sitaram Pandit
 Rajatarangini and the Making of India's Past, Webcast of a talk by Chitralekha Zutshi

History books about India
1140s books
12th-century Indian books
History of Kashmir
Sanskrit texts
Kashmiri literature
Indian chronicles
Indian literature